Jinxiu is a county of eastern Guangxi, China, located in an area of relatively high concentrations of the Yao people. It is administered as the Jinxiu Yao Autonomous County of Laibin City. Established in 1952, with the name of Dayaoshan Autonomous Zone, in 1966, it was renamed as Jinxiu Yao Autonomous County.

Administrative divisions
The county administers 3 towns and 7 townships:

Towns:
Jinxiu, Tongmu, Toupai

Townships:
Sanjiao Township, Zhongliang Township, Luoxiang Township, Changdong Township, Dazhang Township, Liuxiang Township, Sanjiang Township

Ethnic groups
Practically isolated from the outside world until the 1930s, Jinxiu was inhabited by five different branches of Yao: Chashan 茶山, Ao 坳, Hualan 花蓝, Pan 盘, and Shanzi 山子. The first three branches (Chashan 茶山, Ao 坳, Hualan 花蓝) were considered the owners of the lands, as the dates of their first arrivals are estimated at around 1,000 years ago. They lived in settled villages and enjoyed some economic stability. The Pan 盘 and Shanzi 山子 are more recent arrivals, and they lived as tenants of the other established Yao people, living a nomadic life that did not allow them to accumulate many material possessions.

Languages
The languages spoken by each five Yao groups are as follows (L.-Thongkum 1993). Unless indicated otherwise, all locations are in Jinxiu County.
Chashan 茶山 (La Jia 拉架): Lakkja (a Tai-Kadai language); spoken in Jinxiu township
Ao 坳 (Qiong Lie 穹咧): Bjao Muen; a divergent language spoken in Hengcun 横村, Liucang, and Luoxiang 罗香. The speakers claim to have migrated from Guizhou before they settled in Jinxiu County.
Hualan 花蓝 (Biao Men 俵门): Ciəmdi Mun (West Mun); spoken in parts of Jinxiu County, with similar dialects in Naxin and Pingli in Baise
Pan 盘 (Mian 棉): Iu Mien; spoken in Shibajia, Jingui'ao 金龟坳, and Fenzhan 奋战; also in Gunhuai, Baise; an East Mien dialect of Xin'an 新安 and Nadui 纳兑 in Lipu County; and a North Mien dialect of Longwei 龙尾村, Yangshuo County
Shanzi 山子 (Men 门): Kimdi Mun (East Mun); spoken in Guzhan 古占 and Wangluan

Additionally, Jiongnai is spoken in Liuxiang 六巷乡, and Longhua 龙化村 of Changdong 长垌乡. Mao Zongwu (2004) notes that Jiongnai speakers are also given the exonym "Hualan Yao" 花蓝瑶.

L.-Thongkum (1993:170) proposes the following classification scheme for the languages of the four Mienic-speaking groups, which go back to what she calls the Proto-Mjuenic language.

Proto-Mjuenic
Mun
West Mun [Landian Yao 蓝靛瑶]
East Mun [Shanzi Yao 山子瑶]
(Mien-Muen)
Muen [Ao Yao 坳瑶]
Mien [Pan Yao 盘瑶]
North Mien
East Mien, West Mien

Climate

Notes

References

External links

County-level divisions of Guangxi
Yao autonomous counties
Laibin